Dirk Kummer (born 29 September 1966 in Hennigsdorf) is a German actor, director, and screenwriter. He is best known for directing movies Sugar Sand (2017), Wohin mit den Witwen (1999) and Rosenzweig's Freedom (1998).

Early life
Kummer first grew up in Falkensee and moved to East Berlin in 1973. He had his first acting role in 1979 aged 13, in the two-parter TV movie Meines Vaters Straßenbahn on the Deutscher Fernsehfunk channel. After he had graduated from school in 1985, Kummer performed three years of military service with the border troops. Then from 1989 to 1992, he was a master student of the Berlin Academy of Arts in the Performing Arts section. In parallel, he also studied between 1989 and 1990 as a guest at the Konrad Wolf Film University of Babelsberg, specializing in directing and as a guest student at the state-run Berlin drama school Ernst Busch Academy of Dramatic Arts.

His first big movie role was in one of the last DEFA productions called Coming Out. In addition to his involvement as one of the main actors in the role of 'Matthias', he worked in this production as assistant to director Heiner Carow. The premiere of the film took place on the evening of the fall of the Berlin Wall (9 November 1989), at the East Berlin premiere at Kino International.

In 1992, Kummer went to Switzerland and took acting classes there for one year at the University of Music and Performing Arts Bern (now part of University of the Arts Bern). From 1993 to 2002, he worked only sporadically as an actor and mainly as a directing assistant among others with Konrad Sabrautzky,  (Mein Leben & Ich), Kaspar Heidelbach, Susanne Schneider (The Day Will Come), Anna Justice (Remembrance (2011)) and Gunther Scholz. In 2002, he received an author scholarship from the Drehbuchwerkstatt Nürnberg and the Bayerischer Rundfunk.

Since about 2003, Dirk Kummer works almost exclusively as a director and scriptwriter. After stops in Bavaria, Baden-Wuerttemberg and Berlin, he now resides again in Brandenburg.

He has also directed plays at theatres including "Carl's Work - Part 1" (in 2014) and "The Abolition of the Night" (in 2015) at Schauspiel Köln.

His short film Zuckersand was awarded the 'Bernd Burgemeister Fernsehpreis' at the 2017 Munich Film Festival, the 3sat Audience Award at the 2010 Baden-Baden TV Film Festival and the Grimme Prize in 2018. His script for the film was awarded a prize in 2003, the Thomas Strittmatter Award.

Filmography

Actor

Director

References

External links 
 
 Dirk Kummer (professional website)

1966 births
Living people
Film people from Brandenburg
German male actors
German gay actors
People from Oberhavel
21st-century LGBT people